Hasti Gul Abid (born 1 January 1984) is an Afghan cricketer. Gul is a right-handed batsman who bowls right-arm medium pace and plays for the Afghanistan national cricket team.

Born in Nangarhar Province, Gul spent much of his early years in refugee camps with his family, fleeing from the Soviet invasion of Afghanistan and the subsequent Civil War that followed the Soviet withdrawal. Gul, like many of his teammates, learnt the game in neighbouring Pakistan.

He made his List-A debut playing domestic cricket for the Sebastianites Cricket and Athletic Club in Sri Lanka in 2007.

He was a part of the Afghan cricket team that from 2008 to 2009 won the World Cricket League Division Five, Division Four and Division Three, therefore promoting them to Division Two and allowing them to take part in the 2009 ICC World Cup Qualifier where they finished fifth, missing out on the 2011 Cricket World Cup, but gaining them One Day International status. Gul made his ODI debut against Scotland on 19 April 2009.

Shortly after Afghanistan achieved ODI status, Gul was dropped by coach Kabir Khan for their ICC Intercontinental Cup match against Zimbabwe XI. This led his brother, Karim Sadiq, to quit the national setup in protest. Sadiq later returned to represent Afghanistan.

Gul's last appearance for Afghanistan came in their 2009 tour of the Netherlands, during the first One Day International which Afghanistan lost by 8 runs. In Afghan domestic cricket Gul has represented Kabul Province, and currently represents Nangarhar Province.

References

External links
 Hasti Gul on Cricinfo
 Hasti Gul on CricketArchive

1984 births
Living people
Pashtun people
Cricketers from Nangarhar Province
Afghan cricketers
Sebastianites Cricket and Athletic Club cricketers
Afghanistan One Day International cricketers
Afghan expatriates in Pakistan
Afghan cricket coaches